Dan Mark Cohn-Sherbok is a rabbi of Reform Judaism and a Jewish theologian. He is Professor Emeritus of Judaism at the University of Wales.

Biography 
Born in Denver, Colorado, he graduated from East High School (Denver) and was a student at Williams College, Massachusetts,
spending a junior year abroad in Athens, Greece.

He was ordained a Reform rabbi at the Hebrew Union College at Cincinnati. He was a Chaplain of the Colorado House of Representative, and Honorary Colonel Aide-de-Camp of New Mexico.
He has served as a rabbi in the United States, England, Australia and South Africa.
He was a student at Wolfson College, Cambridge, and rowed in the Wolfson College boat. He  received a doctorate in philosophy from the University of Cambridge in England.
Later, he received an honorary doctorate in divinity from the Hebrew Union College-Jewish Institute of Religion, New York City. He taught theology at the University of Kent and served as director of the Centre for the Study of Religion and Society, and was Professor of Judaism at the University of Wales. He has served as visiting professor at  University of Essex, Middlesex University, St. Andrews University, Durham University, University of Vilnius, Lithuania, Charles University, Prague, York St John University,  Trinity University College, St Mary's University, Twickenham, St Andrews Biblical Theological College, Moscow and Honorary Professor at Aberystwyth University.
He has been a visiting fellow at Wolfson College, Cambridge, and Harris Manchester College, Oxford, a Fellow of the Royal Asiatic Society, a Fellow of the Royal Society of Arts,  a Corresponding Fellow of the Academy of Jewish Philosophy, a visiting research fellow of Heythrop College, University of London, a Life Member of Wolfson College, Cambridge, an Honorary Senior Member of Darwin College, University of Kent, an Associate Member of the SCR  Christ Church, Oxford, a Member of the SCR Harris Manchester College, Oxford, and a Member of the London Society for the Study of Religion and the  Arts and Humanities Peer Review College. He has also served as a visiting scholar of  Mansfield College, Oxford, the Oxford Centre for Postgraduate Hebrew Studies and Sarum College.
He was a finalist of the Times Preacher of the Year, and winner of the Royal Academy Friends design competition.
He is married to Lavinia Cohn-Sherbok.

Works 
Cohn-Sherbok is the author and editor of over 100 books which have been translated into Russian, Greek, Bulgarian, Hebrew, French, Portuguese, Spanish, Italian, Chinese, Swedish, Japanese, Romanian, Turkish, Persian and German. He has also illustrated 25 books with cartoons and has contributed cartoons to  books and magazines. His books  include:

———- (2019) Cohn-Sherbok, Lewis, Christopher, Interfaith Worship and Prayer, JKP. ISBN 978-1-78592-120-9.
———-(2020) Cohn-Sherbok, Dan, Cardozo Kindersley, Lida, The Alphabetician and the Rabbi, Cardozo Kindersley.
———-(2020) Cohn-Sherbok, Cave, Peter, Arguing About Judaism, Routledge. ISBN 978-0-367-33406-2
———- (2020) Cohn-Sherbok, Grant, Kevin, The Animal Orchestra, Words. ISBN 978-0-9529352-3-0.
———- (2021) Cohn-Sherbok, Dan, Jews and Jokes, Impress Books
———- (2022) Cohn-Sherbok, Dan, Antisemitism, The History Press

See also 
 Carol Harris-Shapiro

Footnotes

References

"Review of Dan Cohn-Sherbok’s The Politics of Apocalypse, 8 January 2008, Calvin L. Smith

Hebrew Union College – Jewish Institute of Religion alumni
Living people
1945 births
British Reform rabbis
Researchers of new religious movements and cults
Scholars of Mandaeism
Alumni of Wolfson College, Cambridge
Fellows of Wolfson College, Cambridge
Academics of the University of Wales, Lampeter
Williams College alumni
Academics of Durham University
Academics of the University of Essex
Academics of Middlesex University
Fellows of the Royal Asiatic Society